Jose Calayag Reyes Jr. (born September 18, 1950) is a former Associate Justice of the Supreme Court of the Philippines.  Previously, he served on the Philippine Court of Appeals for 15 years.

He was also a state deputy in the Knights of Columbus and was elected to the Order's Supreme Board of Directors in 2016.  With his wife, Maria, he has three children.

References

1950 births
Living people
Associate Justices of the Supreme Court of the Philippines
Place of birth missing (living people)
Justices of the Court of Appeals of the Philippines